() was one of the highest secular titles of the Byzantine Empire. It was an exceptional post (the 899 Kletorologion of Philotheos lists it as one of the 'special dignities'), and conferred only twice in the Empire's history. 

Its holder was not the emperor's biological father, and although the exact functions associated with the post remain obscure, it is generally hypothesized that it was meant to denote a regent acting as a custodian and tutor over a young emperor. A different interpretation, however, has been offered by A. Schmink, whereby the alternative spelling  (βασιλειοπάτωρ), found both in contemporary seals and in the Life of Theophano hagiography, ought to be preferred. The title could then be interpreted as meaning 'father of the palace', confirming the holder's position as the emperor's chief aide without implying any sort of tutelage over him.

The title was created, sometime between August 891 and May 893, by Emperor Leo VI the Wise for Stylianos Zaoutzes, the father of Leo's long-time mistress and later second wife, Zoe Zaoutzaina. More recent scholarship, however, has cast doubt on the image of the "all-powerful " (Shaun Tougher), citing evidence in support of Leo's effective control of the government. Either way, the title placed Stylianos at the apex of the civil bureaucracy, directly below the emperor himself. 

References

Sources
 
 
 

Honorifics
Byzantine court titles
Byzantine imperial titles